Marko Milenkovič (born March 8, 1976 in Kranj) is a retired male medley and backstroke swimmer from Slovenia, who twice competed for his native country at the Summer Olympics: in 2000 and 2004.

References

1976 births
Living people
Slovenian male swimmers
Male backstroke swimmers
Male medley swimmers
Swimmers at the 2000 Summer Olympics
Swimmers at the 2004 Summer Olympics
Olympic swimmers of Slovenia
Sportspeople from Kranj